Ameerega berohoka is a species of poison dart frog that is endemic to Goiás and Mato Grosso in Brazil. It can be found near the Araguaia River and near Itiquira. It can be found in cerrado biome, open and forested areas, and cultivated lands. It is associated with Brachiaria grasses. It is threatened by deforestation, charcoal production and hydroelectric dam construction. It can be found in the protected area of Emas National Park.

References

berohoka
Amphibians described in 2011
Amphibians of Brazil
Endemic fauna of Brazil